This is the list of snowboarding video games.

Franchises
1080° Snowboarding
Cool Boarders
ESPN Winter X-Games Snowboarding
Snowboard Party
SSX

Games

Mobile platforms

See also 
 Snowboarding video game
 Sports game

References